Binaria may refer to:

 Binary number
 In music notation, a two note ligature
 A musical unit formed between Japanese singers Annabel and Nagi Yanagi